Chantal is a feminine given name. 

Chantal may also refer to:

Places
 Chantal, Sud, Haiti, a commune
 Chantal, Chantal, Haiti, a town in the commune
 Chantal Range, in Chukotka, Russia

Other uses
 Jane Frances de Chantal (1572–1641), French saint
, a Panamanian cargo ship in service 1975-78
 Tropical Storm Chantal, various storms
 1707 Chantal, an asteroid
 Chateau Chantal, a winery in Michigan
Chantal, a 1992 album by Chantal Andere

See also
Chantel, a given name
Chantelle (disambiguation)